Resound the Horn is the second album by Italian heavy metal band Doomsword, released in 2002.

Track listing
"Shores of Vinland" – 07:43
"Onward Into Battle" – 07:42
"The Doomsword" – 07:48
"MCXIX" – 05:22
"For Those Who Died with Sword in Hand" – 07:27
"The Youth of Finn Mac Cool" – 05:40
"Resound the Horn: Odin's Hail" – 08:29

References

External links 
 https://www.sputnikmusic.com/soundoff.php?albumid=22259

2002 albums
Doomsword albums